Jack Néel (28 February 1907 – 16 January 1973) was a French architect. His work was part of the architecture event in the art competition at the 1948 Summer Olympics.

References

1907 births
1973 deaths
20th-century French architects
Olympic competitors in art competitions
People from Le Puy-en-Velay